The Honda Verza (known as CB150 Verza since 2018) is a  single-cylinder standard/naked bike made by Astra Honda Motor in Indonesia since 2013. It is the stripped-down counterpart of the CB Trigger and Unicorn, two related motorcycles sold in India, lacking some features of the Trigger and Unicorn.

The Verza is positioned below the more expensive CB150R StreetFire in Astra Honda Motor's sport motorcycles lineup, and intended for more economical purposes rather than performance outlook.



History 
The Verza was introduced by Honda in January 2013 as the cheaper alternative to the CB150R StreetFire. The second iteration, called CB150 Verza, was launched in February 2018. This model has a retro-styling approach rather than modern approach from the previous model.

2013–2018 

The Verza was introduced in January 2013. The engine is claimed to have a maximum power output of  @ 8,500 rpm and maximum torque of  @ 6,000 rpm.

In August 2015, the Verza received a minor cosmetic update, such as chromed exhaust cover, black (previously red) rear shocks and carbon fiber-look instrument panel background.

Performance

2018–present 
In February 2018, Astra Honda Motor released an updated version of the Verza, called CB150 Verza. The update consists of circular headlamp, digital instrument panel and reworked side shroud. The engine remains the same as the previous model, though produces less power and more torque instead.

Specifications

References

External links 

 

Verza
Standard motorcycles
Motorcycles introduced in 2013